Work Choice is a voluntary Department for Work and Pensions programme "which helps disabled people with more complex issues find work and stay in a job".

References

Department for Work and Pensions